Susan Ehlers-Sutton is a retired American cyclist who won a silver medal in the team time trial at the 1987 UCI Road World Championships. Individually she won a bronze medal in the road race at the 1983 national championships.

References

Living people
American female cyclists
Year of birth missing (living people)
21st-century American women